Wowowee is a Philippine noontime variety show that was broadcast by ABS-CBN from 2005 to 2010. The show premiered on February 5, 2005, and aired live on weekdays and Saturdays. The show was also broadcast worldwide through ABS-CBN's The Filipino Channel replacing MTB. The show officially ended on July 30, 2010, and was replaced by a new variety show, Pilipinas Win Na Win, the following day.

Cast

Main host 
Willie Revillame (2005–2010)

Co-hosts 
Mariel Rodriguez (2006–2010)
Valerie Concepcion (2007–2010)
Pokwang (2007–2010)
RR Enriquez (2008–2010)
Jed Montero (2010)
Kelly Misa (2010)

Former co-hosts 
Iya Villania (2005–2006)
Kat Alano (2005–2006)
Janelle Jamer (2005–2007)
Cheena Crab (2005–2007)
Roxanne Guinoo (2007)
Janna Dominguez (2007–2008)
Precious Lara Quigaman (2007–2008)
Carmen Soo (2010)
Isabelle Abiera (2010)

Guest hosts 
Kris Aquino (2005; 2008; 2009)
Amy Perez
Dolphy (2009)
Robin Padilla (2010)
Edu Manzano (2007–2010)
Maricel Soriano (2007)
Billy Crawford (2010)
Kim Atienza (2010)
Luis Manzano (2010)
Cesar Montano (2010)
Gabby Concepcion (2009, 2010)
Vice Ganda (2009)
John Lloyd Cruz (2008, 2010)
KC Concepcion (2010)
Randy Santiago
Dennis Padilla (2010)
Yul Servo (2008–2010)

Featuring 
 Wowowee Dancers (formerly ASF Dancers)  (2005–2010)
 Kembot Girls (2010)
 ASF Boys (2005–2010)
 Wowowee Girls (2005)
 Bentong (2005–2010)
 Luningning (2008–2010)
 Saicy Aguila (2008–2010)
 Mariana del Rio (2008–2009)
 Priscilla Meirelles (2008–2009)
 Ariana Barouk (2008–2009)
 Sandra Seifert (2008–2009)
 Nina Jose (2008–2009)
 Owen Ercia (Jimmy Santol) (2005–2010)
 DJ Coki (2007–2010)
DJ Mod (2005–2007; 2010)

Segments

Cash Motto 
In the Cash Motto segment, a random studio audience member who sent in a motto played a game with winnings up to PHP1,000,000. The contestant had one minute to grab as much cash in the air in a secluded capsule. They could not take peso bills while it is on the tank itself. The contestant was provided a broom to loosen up the money, so more would fly in the air. The amount of money they collected was what they kept. If the total amount of money grabbed reached PHP40,000 or over, the contestant received a Wowowee videoke along with the money they grabbed. Another random studio audience member was chosen after the segment. This second audience member did not get to play the game, but had to guess how much money the first audience member grabbed. The co-hosts usually gave a hint on the range. The contestant had up to three chances to guess how much was won. If the contestant guessed the correct amount, they won whatever the other player won. If they failed to guess, they still won PHP1,000 for being chosen.

Hep, Hep, Hooray 
Twenty (previously ten) random audience members got to play Hep, Hep, Hooray. The game retired at the end of 2009 but quickly returned on January 4, 2010, due to more audience demand than its predecessor, Samson, Lion and Delilah.

In this segment of the show, the audience was prepared to dance to one of Willie Revillame's hit songs. This opening song number was the theme tune for the choosing of the ten random audience members, the audience was warmed up for the public displays of talent, where Willie and his co-hosts drew from the audience, from different sections including the TFC subscribers to dance the song in an entertaining way.

The objective of the game was to repeat the words "Hep Hep" and "Hooray". A co-host put the microphone in front of a contestant's face and they were supposed to say "Hep Hep" while clapping their hands together below their waist, then another co-host would put the microphone to another contestant's face and they were to finish the cheer with saying "Hooray" and raising their hands in the air. If a contestant made a mistake, they were out of the game, but they won PHP1,000 and a gift pack from Rexona as a consolation prize. This was a last person standing game. The one who lasted the longest won.

Since Cash Bukas, the old bonus round for the game moved on to Willie of Fortune, and new rules were written on its relaunch. The final person standing went for the final round, where the contestant could duel against one of the three "Amazonas": April, Lovely, and Aiko. During the duel, the same rules applied, repeating the words "Hep" "Hep" "Hooray". The contestant's goal was to beat the "Amazona" to win the jackpot, which always started at PHP10,000. Every day the jackpot was not won, another PHP10,000 was added to it. On January 25, 2010, Jana was removed as an Amazona due to losing three times; April replaced her. A new batch of Amazonas were introduced on March 8 of the same year, referred to the hosts as "Amazunas". A new name to "Amazunas" was introduced April 10: the "Dragon Ladies". Beginning July 5, the "Dragon Ladies" portion was removed, and the last person standing automatically won P10,000 from Rexona.

On July 26, a new format called the Pair Factor was introduced. The twenty random audience members chose a partner to play with. The rules still mainly stayed the same, however, they had to both clap with "Hep" "Hep", and raise their hands with "Hooray". There were two groups consisting of five pairs each playing in their own group. The winner of rounds one and two would advance to the final round competing against each other.  The last pair standing won P10,000 from Rexona.

Willie of Fortune 
Six people selected earlier through "themed" auditions competed in pairs in rounds of Willie of Fortune. The in-house keyboardist played a portion of a song, and the first person to name the song correctly won one point. If the player could correctly sing the exact lyrics from that portion of the song, they would receive the second point. Two points were required to win the round and get to round two. In this round, the three remaining players went to a knock out question. One song would be played, and whoever could buzz in the correct song title first won PHP10,000 and advanced to the jackpot round, Cash Bukas.

Every Saturday, celebrity teams played against each other. The same gameplay rules used in the weekday version were in effect. However, the team who reached five points first won, and went straight to the jackpot round, Cash Bukas.

Cash Bukas 
In the Cash Bukas segment, the winner of Willie of Fortune (previously the player was taken from Hep, Hep, Hooray) got to play for four prizes. 10 trays were available for the player to select, while the player only selected three to play with. Next, the player chose only one tray. The player was offered increasing amounts of cash until the player took the offer, or kept playing to open the tray. The trays offered in the game were as follows:

 1: PHP100,000
 1: PHP500,000
 1: Grand Pasada Showcase (Sinski Maton)
 1: PHP1,000,000
 6: Cheap prizes (e.g., sandals, salted egg, noisemakers, etc.)

Tic Tac to Win 
Tic Tac to Win was a game that premiered in January 2010, with a format similar to past "end-games" in the show, including its predecessor, Want More, No More. Beginning on February 6 of the same year, the game was played on a recurring basis.

Tumpak o Sablay 
A group of fifty contestants was asked a trivia question that was asked by a random person in the streets, or a celebrity in some cases. The contestants went to either side of the stage "Tumpak" (Correct) or "Sablay" (Fail) to guess if their answer is right or wrong. Similar to Pera o Bayong, the last person standing on the round got to play for the jackpot round with PHP10,000 to keep.

Jackpot Round 
Twenty letters (A-T) with prizes in different amounts were presented on a 5x4 board. The winner of the previous round chose nine letters from the board, and arranged the letters as they desired on a giant tic-tac-toe board. Scattered and hidden in the twenty letters were:

4: Brand new car
4: House and lot
4: PHP1,000,000

Eight letters contained instant cash for the contestant to keep:

4: PHP10,000
3: PHP25,000
1: PHP50,000

The goal was to make a tic-tac-toe of either the car, house, or PHP1,000,000. If a tic-tac-toe was achieved, it was won. If no tic-tac-toe was achieved, the contestant still kept the instant cash that was won on the board.

Discontinued segments

Special shows

World tours 
Wowowee had broadcast episodes from other locations in the Philippines, and had also gone on world tours to other countries such as the United States (Atlantic City, San Francisco, New York City, Las Vegas, Los Angeles, Reno, Chicago, Honolulu, Atlantic City, San Diego, Houston, and Guam), Australia (Sydney), Canada (Winnipeg) and the United Arab Emirates (Dubai).

In celebration of TFC's 15th anniversary and Wowowee'''s 4th anniversary, Wowowee held a grand world tour in 2009. Starting in Dubai, the tour reached Italy, United States (San Francisco, Seattle, Orlando and Las Vegas) and Canada (Toronto).

 2006: Alay sa Kapamilya Alay sa Kapamilya was a program organized by ABS-CBN as an observation for the PhilSports Arena stampede victims.  It preempted Wowowee for six days while the network decided over the fate of the variety show. The shows were a solemn tribute to the victims, featuring performances by ABS-CBN regulars.  Eventually, ABS-CBN decided to temporarily cancel the variety show until its return on March 11, 2006.

 2006: Honoring Overseas Filipino Workers 
On several occasions, the show has paid tribute to Overseas Filipino Workers (OFWs) serving across the world. On the August 2, 2006, episode, Wowowee with cooperation with the Overseas Workers Welfare Administration (OWWA) produced a special edition saluting and featuring female OFW's who returned from Lebanon where a war was present in that country.  They were all invited to attend and even participate in the show that day. The contestants during the first half that day were close friends of the OFWs, while an unspecified number of OFW's participated in "The Ultimate Pera O Bayong".  All the winnings won during the show were combined together and evenly distributed to all of the OFWs in the audience, with the grand total of winnings being PHP1,390,000.

 2007: Armed Forces of the Philippines join Wowowee 
On September 1, 2007, about 500 soldiers came in full force to the show. Representatives from the major services, AFPWSSUS and Technical Services come to play and have fun during the show and take a crack at the grand prizes in different games.

Highlights of the event were the interviews with the loved ones of Marines who lost their lives in the fight against the Abu Sayaff Group/ MILF rebels in Basilan on July 10 and August 11, 2007. Tearfully, loved ones recounted their last communication with the fallen Marines. Host Willie Revillame also asked each of them for a short message and everybody was moved to tears during the emotion-filled moment. AFP, PIO Chief LTC Bartolome Bacarro held back his tears but could not help it, just like the rest. Emotions rose again when candles were lit for the Marines.

 2010: New set and co-hosts 
A new set and a new batch of co-hosts were introduced in April 2010. Joining the four co-hosts already on the show were Carmen Soo, Isabelle Abiera, Jed Montero, and Kelly Misa. The new set consisted of a large LED video wall on the front of the stage with a brand new lighted flooring. Audience seats were moved and had seat numbers that might be used for future games.

The show began with an extravagant opening sequence of Willie Revillame singing and dancing to his hit songs over the past five years. Later, the usual games were played. In Cash Motto, a new format was explained that would begin taking place on April 17 called Cash Mo-Tour, in which the cash tank would travel around Metro Manila and barangays for lucky people to win big. In Hep, Hep, Hooray, the winner will play against the new name of the "Amazunas", the "Dragon Ladies" for the special jackpot of the day, PHP100,000. It was announced on the week of April 12 that the first stop for the Cash Mo-Tour will be held at Plaza Moriones in Tondo, Manila, but due to technical difficulties, it was announced on April 16 that the premiere would be postponed. Two months later on June 19, the game premiered in Valenzuela City.

 Ratings 
During its past 5 years, Wowowee became one of the longest-running noontime show, Eat Bulaga!s biggest opponent. According to TNS National TV Ratings, Wowowee was consistent in hitting the 20% mark. It even hits the 30% mark if the show had special occasions. Example of this is the comeback of Willie Revillame on the show after its 1-month suspension. It rated 32.3%, a 12.1% lead against Eat Bulaga!s 20.2%. It also gave Eat Bulaga! a close fight in Mega Manila, Bulaga's bailiwick while in rural areas, Wowowee was winning via landslide victory against its rival. However, Eat Bulaga! later defeated the show in rural areas due to its "Juan for All, All for Juan" segment.

 Cancellation 
On July 27, 2010, ABS-CBN confirmed that Wowowee would end on July 30, 2010, after five years of airing. This is after Revillame demanded ABS-CBN to fire entertainment writer Jobert Sucaldito over the latter's constant criticisms on Wowowee. Its ending coincided with Eat Bulaga!s 31st anniversary. It was replaced by Pilipinas Win Na Win effective the following day. The new show is a variety game show hosted by Kris Aquino and Robin Padilla. Former Wowowee co-hosts Mariel Rodriguez, Pokwang, and Valerie Concepcion co-host the new show.Wowowee bids a tearful goodbye retrieved via www.abs-cbn.com Jul 31, 2010 However, due to poor ratings, Pilipinas Win Na Win was cancelled after five months.

In January 2011, ABS-CBN announced through its Push.com site that a new noontime show, hosted by ex-Magandang Tanghali Bayan hosts Randy Santiago and John Estrada, as well as Toni Gonzaga and ex-Wowowee host Mariel Rodriguez, was in the works. The show, entitled Happy Yipee Yehey! premiered on February 12, 2011, a week after what would have been the sixth anniversary of Wowowee.

 Controversies 

 Willing Willie and Wil Time Bigtime 
After a five-month hiatus, Willie Revillame made his comeback on the TV5 show Willing Willie. Several personalities from Wowowee are also included in the new show's roster of hosts, including Owen Ercia and DJ Coki.

On November 24, 2010, ABS-CBN filed a copyright infringement suit against Willie Revillame, Wil Productions, Inc. and TV5 for allegedly copying Wowowee in Willing Willie. However, hearings on the case, which was filed at the Makati Regional Trial Court Branch 66 under presiding  judge Joselito C. Villarosa, was suspended after the Court of Appeals granted the request for a temporary restraining order by TV5.

TV5 then filed a petition for certiorari, prohibition and writ of preliminary injunction before the Court of Appeals. ABS-CBN responded by filing a motion seeking to dismiss the petition of the former. On March 10, 2011, the Court of Appeals ruled in favor of TV5.FIRST READ ON PEP: (Updated) Court of Appeals decides in favor of TV5; preserves "status quo" on airing of Willing Willie | PEP.ph: The Number One Site for Philippine Showbiz

On May 14, 2011, Willie Revillame's comeback for the primetime variety show Wil Time Bigtime after 9 months, this show has now officially canceled on January 5, 2013.

 Wowowillie and Wowowin 

TV5 announced the newest noontime variety show Wowowillie. It premiered on January 26, 2013, but the show was cancelled on October 12, 2013, due to the early retirement from television of Willie Revillame as well as poor ratings of the show.

In March 2015, GMA Network announced the comeback of Willie Revillame to Philippine television and to GMA Network via his newest Sunday afternoon variety show, Wowowin. Wowowin, produced by Revillame's WBR Entertainment Productions, premiered on May 10, 2015, nationwide and worldwide via GMA Pinoy TV. The hashtag #Wowowin trended on Twitter nationwide through the night.

 Awards 
2005 KBP Golden Dove Awards Best Variety Show – Won
Best Variety & Game Show (Star Awards for TV) (2009 & 2010) – Won (which was a combination of Best Game Show and Best Variety Show in one category this year)
Best Variety Show (Star Awards for TV) (2008) – Won
 In 2008, tied with GMA Network's Eat Bulaga''. - Won
Best Male TV Host (Willie Revillame) (2005 & 2007) – Won
Best Female TV Host (Janelle Jamer) (2007) – Won
Consumers Award Outstanding Variety Show (2008) – Won
Consumers Award Outstanding Male TV Host (2008) – Won
PMPC Star Awards Best Female TV Host (Valerie Concepcion) (2008 & 2009) – Won
Anak TV Seal Awards (2009) – Won

See also 
 List of shows previously aired by ABS-CBN
 Wil Time Bigtime
 Wowowillie
 Wowowin
 PhilSports Stadium stampede
 Hello Pappy scandal

References

External links 
Official Website
Official TFCnow
Wowowee Episode Information

2005 Philippine television series debuts
2010 Philippine television series endings
ABS-CBN original programming
Philippine variety television shows
Willie Revillame
Filipino-language television shows